The Kristensen Rocks are twin rocks lying  south of Possession Island in the Possession Islands group in the Ross Sea, Antarctica.

About
They were mapped by the United States Geological Survey from surveys and U.S. Navy air photos, 1960–63, and were named by the Advisory Committee on Antarctic Names for Captain Leonard Kristensen who, with Henrik Johan Bull in the ship Antarctic, explored the area and landed on the Possession Islands in 1895.

References

Rock formations of Victoria Land
Borchgrevink Coast